The 2003 Davidoff Swiss Indoors was a men's tennis tournament played on indoor carpet courts at the St. Jakobshalle in Basel in Switzerland and was part of the International Series of the 2003 ATP Tour. The tournament ran from 20 October through 26 October 2003. Unseeded Guillermo Coria won the singles title.

Finals

Singles

 Guillermo Coria defeated  David Nalbandian by walkover
 It was Coria's 5th title of the year and the 6th of his career.

Doubles

 Mark Knowles /  Daniel Nestor defeated  Lucas Arnold /  Mariano Hood 6–4, 6–2
 It was Knowles' 6th title of the year and the 30th of his career. It was Nestor's 6th title of the year and the 32nd of his career.

References

External links
 Official website 
 ATP tournament profile

 
Davidoff Swiss Indoors
Swiss Indoors